Cycle Psycho (also known as The Bloody Slaying of Sarah Ridelander and Savage Abduction) is a 1973 action thriller exploitation film written and directed by John Lawrence and distributed by Troma Entertainment.

Plot
A businessman hires a psychopath to murder his wife. After he accomplishes the deed, the psychopath blackmails the businessman into finding young girls for him to torture and kill. The man makes a deal with a motorcycle gang to kidnap two young girls for that purpose.

Cast
 Joe Turkel as Harry
 Stephen Oliver as Chelsea Miller
 Sean Kenney as Romeo
 Kitty Vallacher as Faye
 Bill Barney as Irish
 Tom Drake	as Dick Ridelander
 Tanis Gallik as Jenny Madison
 Stafford Repp
 Amy Thomson as Lorie

References

External links

1973 films
1970s action thriller films
1970s exploitation films
American action thriller films
American exploitation films
American independent films
Films about kidnapping
Films scored by Jerry Styner
Outlaw biker films
Troma Entertainment films
1970s English-language films
1970s American films